The 2015–16 season was Birmingham City Football Clubs 113th season in the English football league system and fifth consecutive season in the Football League Championship. It covered the period from 1 July 2015 to 30 June 2016. Their Championship record, of 63 points accrued via 16 wins, 15 draws and 15 losses resulting in a tenth-place finish, was exactly the same as in 2014–15. Tenth was the lowest position the team had occupied all season. The average attendance at league matches, of 17,602, was some 9% higher than in 2014–15. As with all clubs in the top two tiers of English football, Birmingham entered the 2015–16 FA Cup in the third round; they lost in that round at home to Premier League club AFC Bournemouth. In the League Cup, they progressed through two rounds before being eliminated by Aston Villa, also of the Premier League, in the third.

Thirty-two players made at least one appearance in first-team competition, of whom six were loan signings and one was registered on a short-term contract; there were eighteen different goalscorers. Team captain Michael Morrison appeared in 49 of the club's 50 fixtures over the season, and played in every minute of the 46 Championship matches. Clayton Donaldson was top goalscorer with 11 goals, all of which were scored in league competition.

Background and pre-season
After narrowly avoiding relegation to League One in 2014, a poor start to the 2014–15 season with only two wins by mid-October brought manager Lee Clark the sack. Under caretaker management, the team lost 8–0 at home to AFC Bournemouth to drop to 23rd place in the table. Burton Albion manager and former Birmingham player Gary Rowett took over, strengthened the defence by bringing in Charlton Athletic's Michael Morrison, initially on loan, and, with the aid of other loan signings including Italian international forward Diego Fabbrini, led them to a 10th-place finish.

First-team players released at the end of the 2014–15 season included Callum Reilly, Nikola Žigić, Matt Green, Olly Lee, Gavin Gunning, youngsters Amari'i Bell and Will Packwood, and long-serving goalkeeper Colin Doyle. First-choice goalkeeper Darren Randolph chose to leave when his contract expired. Free-transfer signings for 2015–16 included winger Jacques Maghoma, previously with Sheffield Wednesday, and two goalkeepers, Adam Legzdins, who started his career with Birmingham but never played for their first team, and former Polish international Tomasz Kuszczak. Undisclosed fees were paid for Groningen's KNVB Cup-winning captain Maikel Kieftenbeld, a Dutch under-21 international defensive midfielder, and Danish forward Nicolai Brock-Madsen; the release clause on Kieftenbeld's contract was widely reported at €250,000, and according to BBC Sport, the fee for Brock-Madsen was "believed to be in the region of £500,000, with possible add-ons taking it up to £1m." Birmingham made one loan signing: attacking midfielder Jon Toral joined from Arsenal for the season. Out-of-contract players who signed new contracts included club captain Paul Robinson, experienced defender Jonathan Spector, and youngsters Nick Townsend, Charlee Adams, Koby Arthur and Viv Solomon-Otabor, the club extended the contracts of defenders Jonathan Grounds and Paul Caddis, top scorer Clayton Donaldson, attacking midfielder Andy Shinnie, and wingers David Cotterill and the in-demand Demarai Gray.

In connection with the club's 140th anniversary in 2015–16, both home and away kits echoed the past. The home kit reproduced the original shirt from 1875, blue with a white sash, with white shorts and blue socks; supporters could pay for their names to be woven into the sash. The away kit reprised the "German flag" kit worn very occasionally in the 1970s, with a yellow right side and sleeve, a broad red central panel, and black left side and sleeve, black shorts and yellow socks with black tops. Both shirts carried intertwined club initials instead of the globe and ball badge. The kits, supplied by Carbrini, bore the logo of sponsors EZE Group, an entertainment and leisure company.

After a training camp in mainland Europe, Birmingham City's pre-season programme continued with friendly matches away to Nuneaton Town, Kidderminster Harriers, Northampton Town, Shrewsbury Town and Burton Albion. They also faced Benfica B at St George's Park. Their only home friendly was against Leicester City.

Football League Championship

August–September
Unlike in recent seasons, there were only three debutants in the opening-day fixture, at home to Reading. With all senior players available for selection, the team lined up in manager Gary Rowett's preferred 4–2–3–1 formation with Kuszczak in goal, Caddis and Grounds at full back, Spector and Morrison at centre back, Kieftenbeld alongside Stephen Gleeson in defensive midfield, Gray and Cotterill as wide midfielders, and Toral in support of lone striker Donaldson. Either side of half-time, Birmingham took a two-goal lead via Cotterill's deflected free kick and Toral's header from Donaldson's cross. Kuszczak's fumble led to the visitors making the score 2–1, but well into stoppage time, substitute David Davis's challenge conceded a penalty. Kuszcazk atoned for his earlier error by parrying the kick, and Reading's Simon Cox failed to convert the rebound.

Away to Burnley, Birmingham twice took the lead, first when Toral ran on to Donaldson's through ball and finished with a first-time shot from the edge of the penalty area, and then via Caddis's penalty, and Cotterill hit the post with a free kick, but with five minutes left, Matt Taylor's powerful free kick earned the hosts a point. Birmingham's penalty caused controversy: there seemed to be little contact by the defender on Donaldson, whose post-match claim that "You get told if you get a slight touch go down" prompted accusations of cheating. The visit to Brentford, scheduled for 18 August, was postponed six days before the scheduled date of 18 August because the hosts needed to re-lay the Griffin Park pitch on an emergency basis. Unusually, they agreed to reimburse supporters for non-refundable travel costs already incurred.

Against Derby County, Gleeson's deflected shot from distance – his first goal for the club – gave Birmingham the lead, which Toral should have increased, but the visitors equalised after an hour, had striker Chris Martin yellow-carded for simulation when he appeared to have been fouled inside the area, and hit the frame of the goal three times, including an excellent save from Kuszczak to turn Andi Weimann's shot onto the post and catch the rebound. After the game, Rowett made comparisons with some of the richer clubs in the division, claiming that although his "team of free transfers and players bought with someone’s pocket money" were "more than matching teams", they were "always disappointed coming in we haven't done a little bit more." The second goal of Gleeson's Birmingham career opened the scoring in the club's first League visit to his former club, Milton Keynes Dons: he curled Donaldson's cutback over the goalkeeper into the corner of the net. Later in the game, he was stretchered off with an ankle injury that proved less serious than initially feared. To complete a 2–0 win, substitute Maghoma ran on to Donaldson's through ball and placed it wide of the goalkeeper.

DonaldsonBirmingham's leading scorer in 2014–15made up for this season's goal drought with a first-half hat-trick at home to Bristol City. The third goal came from a penalty awarded for a foul on Toral; Bristol City's manager, Steve Cotterill, thought Toral should have been booked for simulation. Regular penalty-taker Caddis allowed Donaldson to take the kick to complete his hat-trick, and a Grounds header completed a 4–2 win. After five league matches with an unchanged starting eleven, Rowett brought in Maghoma for Gray for the visit of Nottingham Forest, who inflicted Birmingham's first defeat of the season and became the first team to prevent them scoring. Forest scored after 54 minutes, after which Gray and league debutants Brock-Madsen and Solomon-Otabor entered the game, but in vain. Rowett was disappointed by the way the team "became a little frantic and a little bit too hurried and desperate on the ball and did not show enough quality."

Neal Eardley, returning to league football after nearly a year out injured, lasted 44 minutes of the visit to Ipswich Town before dislocating his shoulder. On his first start of the season, Shinnie exploited a defensive error to play Cotterill in for the opening goal, which was equalised ten minutes later via a penalty awarded against Spector, a decision that divided opinion. The flatness of their second consecutive home defeat, 2–0 to bottom-of-the-table Rotherham United, was arguably a reaction to the midweek League Cup defeat at Aston Villa. September ended with the rearranged visit to Brentford; since the original date, the club had sold their 2014–15 top scorer Andre Gray, sacked their manager, and appointed former Birmingham captain Lee Carsley in his place. With Shinnie injured, Rowett brought Davis into a three-man defensive midfield, and unexpectedly gave club captain Robinson his first league start in several months. A 2–0 win via Morrison's header from a corner and Gleeson's long ball that Donaldson chipped over the goalkeeper left Birmingham in fifth place, six points behind leaders Brighton & Hove Albion.

October–November
Birmingham prolonged Leeds United's run without a home win courtesy of a fine performance by Gray, capped by a powerful shot from inside the penalty area for his first goal of the season, two saves by Kuszczak, and a stoppage-time goal from substitute Maghoma. Their own winning run continued at home to Queens Park Rangers, when they came from behind via Robinson's header from Gray's free kickhis second goal for the club in 127 matchesand a second-half penalty converted by Caddis after Donaldson was fouled, and away to bottom club Bolton Wanderers, when Robinson and Gray repeated their partnership for the only goal of the match after 20 minutes. What the BBC's reporter called "some desperate Blues defending", aided by the introduction of Spector as a sweeper to protect the back four, helped Birmingham hold their lead and go second in the table. Rowett retained that formation for the visit to Hull City, but the hosts profited from the additional freedom available to their midfield and won 2–0. On the anniversary of Rowett's first match in charge, a goalless draw away to Wolverhampton Wanderers, Birmingham lost 2–0 at home to the same opponents. He was critical of the team's lack of quality, feeling they "needed to be more inventive and show more composure on the ball."

Birmingham's first home clean sheet of the season combined with a third consecutive failure to score produced a goalless draw at home to 15th-placed Blackburn Rovers, marred by an injury to Cotterill's knee that kept him out of Championship football until February. A free-flowing performance and five goals away followed against a defensively poor Fulham side. In stoppage time, Solomon-Otabor scored his first senior goal: after a run down the left, "a neat turn that left Richard Stearman on his backside was followed by a clinical finish". Donaldson returned from making his international debut for Jamaica with a groin injury that was predicted to keep him out for six weeks. Rowett suggested the damage could have been less serious had Donaldson not played the whole match despite being obviously unfit, but Jamaica coach Winfried Schäfer said the player had insisted on continuing. The inexperienced Brock-Madsen led the line at home to Charlton Athletic. Their manager, Karel Fraeye, "aware that Birmingham struggle at home when they try to be dominant", fielded a well-organised team who scored from what Rowett described as "their only real chance on goal in the whole game." A defeat at Brighton & Hove Albion put the hosts top of the table and left Birmingham in sixth place going into December.

December–January
Rowett's proactive changes at home to Huddersfield Townadopting a 4–3–3 formation and a pressing stylewere countered by the "worst start you could ever have", as Aston Villa fan and former Birmingham trainee Joe Lolley scored after 33 seconds; for the fourth game running, Birmingham could not do the same, and suffered their third consecutive defeat. With loanee James Vaughan leading the line, Birmingham played out a goalless draw at Middlesbrough in wet and windy conditions; according to the BBC's reporter, Morrison "should have won it when he headed wide late on". A penalty, awarded in first-half stoppage time for handball when the ball appeared to strike the "offender" in the face, was converted by substitute Caddis to secure Birmingham's first league win since 7 November. Defensive errors led to a 3–0 defeat at Sheffield Wednesday, and the last fixture of 2015, at home to Milton Keynes Dons, saw the return to the starting eleven of Donaldson and a 1–0 win courtesy of Maghoma, who "performed not one but two cut-backs, sending six Dons players the wrong way before unleashing a fierce strike into the roof of the net", which took Birmingham into the new year ninth in the table.

Despite the absence of Grayon the verge of completing a £3.5 million transfer to Premier League club Leicester Cityand a first-half injury to Donaldson, Birmingham secured a 2–1 win at home to Brentford via Kieftenbeld's 89th-minute winner. He won the ball in midfield, played it through to Vaughan, and kept running; when Vaughan shot across goal, Kieftenbeld arrived at the far post just in time to slide the ball home for his first goal for the club. A draw at Nottingham Forest preceded a 3–0 win at third-placed Derby County by a Birmingham side described by the Observer reporter as "tight at the back, and clinical in attack". Kieftenbeld completed the win by "crashing home a brilliant first-time volley from the edge of the area", a feat he repeated in the next match, also 3–0, at home to Ipswich Town. The second goal in that match, when "Kuszczak launched a free kick down the middle, Clayton Donaldson headed on and before the ball hit the ground Toral fired a dipping volley over the goalkeeper from 25 yards", earned its scorer the club's Goal of the Season award. A goalless draw at Bristol City meant Birmingham went through January unbeaten with eleven points from their five matches, which brought the team back into the play-off positions and earned Rowett a nomination for Championship Manager of the Month to add to Kieftenbeld's Player of the Month nomination. They lost out to Hull City's Steve Bruce and Abel Hernández respectively.

February–March
Donaldson scored his first goal since November in the fifth of thirteen minutes of first-half stoppage time, as a result of injuries to Sheffield Wednesday's Keiren Westwood and Sam Hutchinson, but the arrival of Atdhe Nuhiu as a second-half substitute changed the game and Gary Hooper's two goals in two minutes gave the visitors a win. Rotherham United marked the arrival of Neil Warnock as manager with two sendings-off in a goalless draw at home to Birmingham. A minute's applause in memory of former Birmingham manager Freddie Goodwin, who had led the team to promotion to the First Division in 1971–72 and twice reached the semifinals of the FA Cup, preceded the visit of struggling Bolton Wanderers. Having averted an imminent winding-up order by agreeing a takeover deal, they lost 1–0 at Birmingham to a Donaldson goal set up by Diego Fabbrini, making his first start since signing a permanent contract with the club. February ended with a poor first-half performance that was punished with a 2–0 defeat at Queens Park Rangers.

March began with second-placed Hull City's first loss of 2016 as former Birmingham defender Curtis Davies deflected Toral's shot past his own goalkeeper, but defeat at Blackburn Rovers dropped Birmingham to ninth position. A man-of-the-match performance from Davis, recalled to the starting eleven for the visit to Wolverhampton Wanderers, his former club, was spoilt only when Carl Ikeme made a "great save" to stop his powerful shot giving Birmingham a victory. Davis again nearly won the match at home to Fulham late on with a shot that hit the post, but another draw kept Birmingham in ninth, but now six points off the play-off places albeit with a game in hand.

April–May
A rearranged schedule because of cup commitments or for television broadcast meant Birmingham had eight fixtures in 28 days in April, including home matches against the top three teams in the division. They began at Charlton Athletic, who were on the verge of relegation. After a delay caused by home fans throwing hundreds of sponge footballs onto the pitch as part of an ongoing protest against the club's ownership, Charlton won via a 94th-minute header from a corner when "everyone is back and two or three players were stood watching while their player heads it in." With the loan window about to close, Birmingham signed Northern Ireland international striker Kyle Lafferty. The move was in both parties'interests: Rowett hoped to improve Birmingham's goalscoring and with it their chances of reaching the play-offs, and the player had hardly appeared for Norwich City, his parent club, and needed match fitness ahead of the upcoming European Championships. Lafferty returned from international duty with a groin injury, and it was rumoured that he would miss the rest of the season, but he was fit to start the home match against third-placed Brighton & Hove Albion on 5 April. He opened the scoring after 16 minutes with a tap-in following a goalkeeping error, but Brighton went on to win 2–1.

Away to Reading, Donaldson headed home after two minutes for his first goal in six weeks, and Cotterill's free kick was parried into the path of Ryan Shotton to secure the win with his first goal for the club. Donaldson scored again three days later, but as a consolation with Birmingham already 2–0 down at home to Leeds United, the defeat left them nine points outside the play-off places. At home to second-placed Burnley, Rowett thought Birmingham were the better team. They equalised though Maghoma's header after Toral's shot was parried, and Grounds headed against the crossbar, but towards the end of the game Championship Player of the Year-elect Andre Gray was left unmarked and touched home a cross. It proved to be Toral's last appearance. He was sent off for a second yellow card in stoppage time, for a foul on former Birmingham loanee Lloyd Dyer, and then injured a hamstring in training that was to keep him out for the last few weeks of the season. He had scored eight goalssecond behind Donaldson over the seasonand provided three assists. After Donaldson's third and fourth goals since Lafferty's arrival gave Birmingham the lead at home to Preston North End, the visitors scored twice towards the end of the game to ensure that the play-offs were mathematically out of reach. According to Rowett, "the last 15 minutes was one of the weakest I've seen in a game", and he vowed to "make sure that I will not have players in the team who are happy with that kind of performance." Despite Huddersfield Town's statistical dominance, with 65% possession, 18 shots to 5 and 15 corners to 2, Birmingham again "squandered an advantage" given them by Cotterill's free kick to concede a late equaliser and come close to losing the match.

Despite being rescheduled to a Friday night for live television, Birmingham's last home match of the season drew a season-high attendance of 21,380boosted by nearly 5,000 visiting supporters and encouraged by a newly formed "singing section" in the Tilton Road end of the groundwho saw an exciting 2–2 draw with Middlesbrough. Gleeson's powerful shot from distance opened the scoring after half an hour, but a few minutes later, Legzdinsin the team because Kuszczak had had surgery on his broken nose"fumbled the ball as if it was a bar of soap" and Jordan Rhodes tapped in. In the second half, Albert Adomah gave the visitors the lead, Davis's well-placed shot from the edge of the penalty areahis first goal of the seasontied the scores, and a minute later, a Middlesbrough "winner" was disallowed for offside, apparently wrongly. Both goalkeepers made fine saves and both sides had other chances, but the draw was enough to take Middlesbrough top of the table by one point, although Burnley and Brighton both had a game in hand.

The season ended at Cardiff City. With Rowett prioritising players who would be at Birmingham in 2016–17, young midfielder Charlee Adams made his first start and the only loanee in the matchday squad was Shotton, who lost his starting place to Robinson. Morrison, making his 400th league appearance, completed the league season ever-present. Cotterill scored first, from distance, and Birmingham seemed comfortable until Anthony Pilkington took advantage of Grounds' failure to clear a cross. Both Fabbrini and Vaughan hit the post, and Craig Noone and Pilkington made goalline clearances from Cotterill's free kick and Vaughan's late header respectively. The match was drawn, and results elsewhere meant Birmingham finished tenth, with 16 wins and 15 draws, just as they had done in 2014–15. They had won just once in the last 12 matches of the campaign, and tenth was the lowest position they had occupied all season.

Match results

Final league table (part)

Results summary

FA Cup

As with all first- and second-tier teams, Birmingham entered the competition at the third-round (last-64) stage. They were drawn at home to Premier League AFC Bournemouth, who had won 8–0 when the two teams met at St Andrew's in the 2014–15 Championship. The visitors made eleven changes from their previous league match, Birmingham seven. Morrison's header from Cotterill's cross after 40 minutes gave his side the lead, but Grounds conceded a penalty four minutes later from which the visitors equalised. Cotterill and Eardley both went off injured at half-time, giving new signing Shane Lowry an opportunity at centre-back. Birmingham were awarded a penalty after an hour. With regular penalty-taker Caddis rested, Vaughanthe son of a Birmingham fantook the kick and hit it powerfully but too high. Maghoma hit the post when it should have been easier to score, other chances were missed, and with five minutes left, substitute Glenn Murray took advantage of a goalkeeping error to secure a win for Bournemouth.

League Cup

In the first round, Birmingham were drawn away against Bristol Rovers. This was the second consecutive season that their first-round opponents were the team promoted to the Football League via the Conference play-offs. While wary of the dangerswell illustrated at Blyth Spartans in the 2014–15 FA Cupof making too many team changes, Rowett still selected only three players who had started the previous league match. There were debuts for youth team product Adam Legzdins, who rejoined the club in the summer, nine years after his single appearance on the first-team bench, and for Jacques Maghoma, who opened the scoring after Wes Thomas intercepted an attempted back pass. Victory came rather more easily in the second round at home to League One club Gillingham, as two goals from Thomas earned Birmingham a trip to Villa Park in the third round.

Because of the history of trouble at recent fixtures against Aston Villa, Birmingham's allocation of tickets was set at 2,800, less than the 10% of capacity required under the rules of the competition, and far fewer than the 6,500 given to another local team, West Bromwich Albion, in the 2014–15 FA Cup. Rowett selected a full-strength team, and Sky Sports reporter suggested that "Birmingham look set for a good season in the second tier on this evidence", as they were edged out by Villa's half-time additions of Jack Grealish and Jordan Ayew and a Rudy Gestede header.

Transfers

In

 Brackets around club names indicate the player's contract with that club had expired before he joined Birmingham.

Out

 Brackets round a club denote the player joined that club after his Birmingham City contract expired.

Loan in

Loan out

Appearances and goals
Source:
Numbers in parentheses denote appearances as substitute.
Players with name and squad number struck through and marked  left the club during the playing season.
Players with names in italics and marked * were on loan from another club for the whole of their season with Birmingham.
Players listed with no appearances have been in the matchday squad but only as unused substitutes.
Key to positions: GKGoalkeeper; DFDefender; MFMidfielder; FWForward

References

Birmingham City
Birmingham City F.C. seasons